Sierra del Mugrón is a  long mountain range located between the shire of Valle de Cofrentes, Valencian Community, and Almansa, Castile-La Mancha, Spain. It is an isolated range between the Iberian System and the Cordillera Prebética. Its highest point is 1,209 m. The northern section of this range is within the Ayora municipal term, while the southern belongs to Almansa.

There are remains of an Ancient Iberian settlement in Castellar de Meca, between Ayora and Alpera.

This mountain range is a quiet lonely and isolated area with a sizeable amount of wildlife, foremost of which are the wildcat, boar, little bustard, Eurasian stone-curlew, peregrine falcon, European nightjar, black wheatear, common wood pigeon, Dartford warbler, red-legged partridge and Bonelli's eagle.

See also
Mountains of the Valencian Community

References

External links
 J. P. Calvo Sorando, S. Ordóñez Ddelgado & J. Usera Mata, Estudio del Terciario marino de la sierra del Mugrón (Prov. Albncete y Valencia) 
 El mágico rincón de San Pascual 
 Excursión a Castellar de Meca (Sierra del Mugrón)
 Sierra del Mugrón - Flora
 Sierra del Mugrón - Biodiversity
 Protests against antennas in Sierra del Mugrón
 Wikiloc

Mountain ranges of the Valencian Community
Mountain ranges of Castilla–La Mancha